Benjamin Santelli (born 16 November 1991) is a French professional footballer who plays as a winger for Ligue 2 club Bastia.

Career
On 28 May 2019, Santelli signed professionally with Ligue 2 side FC Chambly after years of playing in non-professional teams in his native Corsica. He made his professional debut with Chambly in a 1–0 league win over Valenciennes on 26 July 2019, scoring the game winning goal and the first ever for Chambly in the division. A few days into the season, he sustained a cruciate ligament injury.

After one season with Chambly, Santelli returned to former club SC Bastia, newly promoted to Championnat National. He agreed a two-year contract with the option of a further year.

References

External links
 
 
 Foot National Profile
 

1991 births
Living people
Sportspeople from Bastia
French footballers
Association football wingers
SC Bastia players
FC Chambly Oise players
CA Bastia players
Ligue 2 players
Championnat National players
Championnat National 2 players
Championnat National 3 players
Footballers from Corsica